There are hundreds of lakes in the Sawtooth Mountains, most of which have been created by alpine glaciers.  The majority of the lakes are within the Sawtooth Wilderness, but several are not yet still within Sawtooth National Recreation Area The largest lakes are Redfish, Alturas, Pettit, Yellow Belly, Stanley, and Sawtooth lakes.

Lakes not in the Sawtooth Wilderness

Lakes in the Sawtooth Wilderness

See also

 Sawtooth National Forest
 Sawtooth National Recreation Area

References

External links
Inventory of all lakes in the Sawtooth Wilderness

Lakes of the Rocky Mountains
Lakes of Idaho
Glacial lakes of the United States
Sawtooth Mountains
Sawtooth National Forest
Sawtooth Range (Idaho)
Sawtooth Wilderness